Apamea atriclava is a moth of the family Noctuidae. It is found in parts of North America, including British Columbia.

The wingspan is about 43 mm.

It was formerly considered to be a subspecies of Apamea lignicolora.

External links
Images

Apamea (moth)
Moths of North America
Taxa named by William Barnes (entomologist)
Taxa named by James Halliday McDunnough
Moths described in 1913